Groff v. Dejoy (Docket 22-174), is a pending United States Supreme Court case regarding religious liberty and employment accommodations under Title VII of the Civil Rights Act of 1964. The plaintiff seeks the Supreme Court's reconsideration of the precedent set in Trans World Airlines, Inc. v. Hardison.

Background 
Gerald E. Groff, the petitioner in this case was a postman, specifically a Rural Carrier Associate (RCA), working for the United States Postal Service (USPS) from 2012 till 2019. He is an evangelical, protestant Christian and observes Sunday Sabbath. As a result, his religion requires him to rest and worship on a Sunday instead of working.

In 2013, Amazon contracted USPS to deliver their packages. Quarryville soon became an important hub and started delivering Amazon packages from 2015 onwards. Groff was initially an RCA at the Quaryville post office and informed USPS of his religious need and his inability to work on Sundays. Accordingly, the USPS moved to accommodate his religious requirements by allowing him not to work on Sunday insofar as he covers the other shifts throughout the week.

However, on May 2016, a Memorandum of Understanding (MOU) between the USPS and the National Rural Letter Carriers' Association only allowed the exemption of work on Sunday on 2 conditions; (1) if the person had applied for leave on that day, and, (2) if the person would have exceeded the limit of 40 hours of work that week on Sunday.

The MOU did not provide Groff with a religious exemption to working on Sundays and as a result, the USPS again moved to accommodate him by transferring him to a smaller station that did not do Amazon delivery then, the Holtwood post office.

Similarly to Quarryville, Holtwood also started Sunday Amazon deliveries on March 2017. The USPS. The postmaster at Holtwood then tried to oblige with his request by allowing him to pray on Sunday morning before returning to work later in the day, Groff refused such an offer and skipped work on Sundays. In the peak season of 2017, another RCA volunteered to take over his shifts on Sunday, but the personnel fell ill, leaving the rest of the RCAs and the postmaster to be additionally burdened to take over delivery on Sundays.

Groff continued to be absent from his scheduled work on Sundays after the 2017 peak season and consequently was punished, so he filed a complaint asking USPS to transfer him to a job that did not require him to work on Sundays. This complaint was promptly denied as no position in USPS had such an exemption.

Groff eventually resigned in 2019 and sued the USPS for 2 reasons, he was “disparate(ly) treat(ed)” due to his religion and failure to accommodate his religion.

Lower courts decision 
In the United States District Court of the Eastern District for Pennsylvania, Groff argued that the company discriminated against him.

In his first argument, the defendant argued that he had direct evidence that the USPS discriminated against him. Nevertheless, the court found the evidence provided by Groff against the USPS to be insufficient. Therefore, the McDonnell Douglas Burden Shifting Test was adopted, which places the burden on the defendant, Groff, to show that there was a prima facie case of religious discrimination, which Groff's argument does. The burden then shifted to the USPS to reason if there is a non-discriminatory reason to do so, the USPS did so by proving the importance of Sunday Amazon delivery due to their poor financial situation. The burden shifted back to the petitioner to prove a pretext, which he failed to do so. Therefore, the court rejected his first argument.

In his second argument on failure to accommodate, the court rejected the argument saying that the employer does not need to entirely rectify the conflict to accommodate and they do not need to accommodate the request due to Groff’s request adding an undue hardship on the company. The court adds that satisfying the demands by the petitioner is more than the de-minimis-cost test set up by the case, Trans World Airlines, Inc. v. Hardison.

Groff appealed to the United States Court of Appeal for the Third Circuit, who affirmed the lower court’s decision by a 2-1 decision, with Judge Hardiman dissenting.

Groff then appealed the decision by the lower courts by appealling to the Supreme Court.

Supreme Court 
Fifteen Republican members of Congress filed an amicus brief in support of the plaintiff, on 26 September 2022, arguing that the standard set in Hardison for "undue hardship" was irreconciliable with the text and congressional purpose of Title VII, asking the court to grant certiorari and overturn its precedent.

The Supreme Court discussed the case in their January 13, 2023 conference and decided to hear the case.

See also 
 Estate of Thornton v. Caldor, Inc.
 Religion and business § Landmark United States Supreme Court cases

References

External links 

2023 in United States case law
United States Supreme Court cases
United States Supreme Court cases of the Roberts Court
United States civil rights case law